Lawrence M. Schoen (born July 27, 1959) is an American author, publisher, psychologist, hypnotist, and expert in the Klingon language.

Biography

Schoen was born in Chicago, Illinois, but his family moved to Southern California when he was 18 months old, and he grew up in Culver City.

In 1983, he graduated with B.S. in psycholinguistics from California State University, Northridge, having designed his own major, and then moved on to Kansas State University where he earned his M.S. and Ph.D. in psychology. In graduate school, Schoen's research focused on cognitive psychology and psycholinguistics.

Doctorate in hand, he spent the next ten years in academia as an assistant professor at New College of Florida, Lake Forest College in Illinois, and Chestnut Hill College in Pennsylvania. He then moved to the private sector and served for about 17 years as the director of research and analytics for a medical center which provides mental health and addiction treatment service works throughout Philadelphia.

In August 2019, Schoen was diagnosed with multiple myeloma and began treatment. The following January, he underwent an autologous bone marrow transplant and entered a new regimen of chemotherapy. As of February 2021, he was in remission.

Schoen lives in Blue Bell, Pennsylvania.

Author
Schoen attended the 1998 session of James Gunn's two-week Writers' Workshop in Science Fiction on the campus of the University of Kansas. In 2010, he participated in Walter Jon Williams' two-week master class, the Taos Toolbox.

He has been nominated for the Astounding Award for Best New Writer, the Hugo Award for Best Short Story, the Nebula Award for Best Novella three times, as well as receiving nominations for both the Nebula Award for Best Novel and the  Cóyotl Award for Best Novel.

Some of his more notable works as an author include the Amazing Conroy series of science fiction stories and novels, the first of which appeared in 2001, about a space-traveling stage hypnotist and his alien companion animal (a "buffalito") that can consume anything and farts oxygen. Among these, the short story "Yesterday's Taste" and the novellas Barry's Tale (2012), Trial of the Century (2013), and Calendrical Regression (2015) have received award nominations.

Schoen appeared at Book Expo America in May 2015, where he was presented as one of four authors described by Tor Books as the next generation of science fiction and fantasy, based on his novel Barsk: The Elephants' Graveyard,  anthropomorphic SF that explores prophecy, intolerance, political betrayal, and a drug that lets one talk to the dead.

From 2015 to 2018, he was part of the staff at Orson Scott Card's InterGalactic Medicine Show as Reprint Editor, replacing Darrell Schweitzer as the magazine's interviewer.

Klingonist

Schoen founded the Klingon Language Institute and has published Klingon translations of William Shakespeare's plays Hamlet (The Klingon Hamlet) and Much Ado About Nothing, as well as the Epic of Gilgamesh and the Tao Te Ching. In the realm of Klingon nonfiction, Schoen edited and published The Grammarian's Desk (978-0964434530), a collection of essays written by Captain Krankor (Rich Yampell). He also served as the editor of HolQeD (ISSN 1061-2327), the quarterly journal of the KLI, for the entirety of its 13-year run. He was featured in Director Alexandre O. Philippe's documentary about the Klingon Language Institute, Earthlings: Ugly Bags of Mostly Water (2004). In 2011, he produced a daily Klingon language podcast called DaHjaj Hol. (See Klingon Language Institute#Publications.)

Small press publisher

Schoen is the publisher and chief editor for Paper Golem, a speculative fiction small press started in November, 2006.  The first book it published was Prime Codex, an anthology of previously published stories by members of the Codex Writers Group, of which Schoen is a founding member. Paper Golem is Schoen's vehicle for "paying it forward," and focuses on two mains tracks: publishing single author collections by relatively new authors (e.g., Cat Rambo in 2009, Eric James Stone in 2011), and the Alembical series, which produces anthologies of original novellas (J. Kathleen Cheney's novella "Iron Shoes", from Alembical 2, received a nomination for the Nebula Award).

Hypnotist

In 2013, Schoen took a page from one of his fictional creations and became certified as a hypnotherapist by the International Association of Professional Conversational Hypnotists (IAPCH), with the intention of developing materials to aid other writers grappling with problems common to their field (e.g., writer's block).

Bibliography

The Universe of Barsk (Series)
 Barsk: The Elephants' Graveyard (Dec 2015), Tor Books Nebula Award Finalist,  Cóyotl Award Winner.
 The Moons of Barsk (Aug 2018), Tor Books Cóyotl Award Winner.
 Excerpts of Jorl ben Tral (March 2020) Paper Golem LLC.
 Soup of the Moment (September 2020), Paper Golem LLC Cóyotl Award Finalist.

The Conroyverse

The Amazing Conroy (series)
In chronological story order:

 Buffalito Bundle, (Book 1)  (July 2019) Paper Golem LLC
 Buffalo Dogs, (Summer 2001) in Absolute Magnitude #16 and also appeared in Buffalogic, Inc.: Tales of the Amazing Conroy #1, SRM Publisher
 Buffalogenesis (2006), in Buffalogenesis: Tales of the Amazing Conroy #2, SRM Publisher 
 A Buffalito Of Mars, (2007) ) in Visual Journeys: A Tribute to Space Artists, Hadley Rille Books
 Requiem, (2005)  in Absolute Magnitude and also appeared in Buffalogistics: Tales of the Amazing Conroy #3, SRM Publisher
 Mind Din, (July 2019) first printed in Buffalito Bundle (see Omnibus Editions)
 Telepathic Intent, (2003) in Buffalogic, Inc.: Tales of the Amazing Conroy #1, SRM Publisher
 The Matter At Hand, (2008) in Buffalogistics: Tales of the Amazing Conroy #3, SRM Publisher
 Yesterdays Taste, (October 2011) in Transtories, Aeon Press WSFA Small Press Award Finalist
 Barry's Tale (Book 2)  (December 2012) in Buffalito Buffet, Hadley Rille Books Nebula Award Finalist 2012 
 Calendrical Regression (Book 3)  (November 2014), Noble Fusion Press Nebula Award Finalist 2014 
 Barry's Deal (Book 4)  (November 2017), Noble Fusion Press Nebula Award Finalist 2017
 Buffalito Destiny (Book 5)  (June 2009) Hadley Rille Books
 Trial of the Century (Book 6)  (December 2013), in World Jumping, Hadley Rille Books Nebula Award Finalist 2013
 Buffalito Contingency (Book 7)  (July 2011) Hadley Rille Books

Omnibus Editions

 Buffalito Bundle (July 2019) Paper Golem LLC An omnibus edition of all the stories leading up to and including “Yesterdays Taste” i.e. Buffalo Dogs, Buffalogenesis, A Buffalito Of Mars, Requiem, Mind Din, Telepathic Intent, The Matter At Hand and Yesterdays Taste. 
 Buffalito Buffet (December 2012) Hadley Rille Books.  An omnibus edition of all the stories at the time leading up to and including the first printing of Barry's Tale before it was printed separately. i.e. Buffalo Dogs, “Telepathic Intent”, “Requiem”, “The Matter at Hand”, “Introduction” essay by Howard Taylor, “Buffalogenisis”, “Barry's Tale”, “A Buffalito of Mars”, “Yesterday's Taste”.
 Galactic Capers of the Amazing Conroy (August 2020) Paper Golem LLC. An omnibus edition featuring the four Novella award nominated novellas from the series: Barry's Tale (Finalist), Calendrical Regression (Finalist), Barry's Deal (Finalist) and Trial of the Century (Finalist).
 Command Performance (May 2020) Paper Golem LLC The complete Amazing Conroy omnibus ebook.

Freelance Courier (series)

 Ace of Corpses (July 2020), Paper Golem LLC 
 Ace of Saints (Jan 2021) Paper Golem LLC
 Ace of Thralls (June 2021) Paper Golem LLC
 Ace of Agency (August 2021) Paper Golem LLC. The omnibus edition of the series so far:  Ace of Corpses, Ace of Saints and Ace of Thralls.

Pizza in Space (series)

 Slice of Entropy (February 2021), Paper Golem LLC
 Slice of Chaos (Aug 2022), Paper Golem LLC

Other titles from the Conroyverse

In addition to the above, the following stories include characters from or are set in the same universe as the Amazing Conroy works:

 Bidding the Walrus, first appeared in Low Port (2003) (eds. Sharon Lee and Steve Miller), Meisha Merlin Publishing, Inc.. 
 Texas Fold'em, first appeared in nanobison (Dec 2006), also in Space Westerns (2008).

Conroyverse Omnibus

 Conroyverse: A Sampler (February 2021), Paper Golem LLC. An omnibus sampler of the Conroyverse including the first story that launched the fictional universe and of each of the first novels of the series that share that universe:  From “The Amazing Conroy” series, “Buffalo Dogs”, “Buffalo Destiny”.  From “Freelance Courier” series: “Ace of Corpses” and from “Pizza in Space” series, “Slice of Entropy”.

Pirates of Sol

 Pirates of Marz (April 2021), Paper Golem LLC

Collaborations with Jonathan P. Brazee

Seeds of War (series)

 Seeds of War: Invasion (Volume 1) (June 2018, with Jonathan P. Brazee) Semper Fi Press.
 Seeds of War: Scorched Earth (Volume 2) (July 2018, with Jonathan P. Brazee) Semper Fi Press.
 Seeds of War: Bitter Harvest (Volume 3) (Sept 2018, with Jonathan P. Brazee) Semper Fi Press.
 Seeds of War Trilogy (Omnibus) (October 2018, with Jonathan P. Brazee) Semper Fi Press.

Collaborations with Brian Thorne

Adrenaline Rush (series)

 Fight or Flight (Book 1) (Aug 2022, with Brian Thorne) LMBPN Publishing. Originally published (Jan 2020, with Brian Thorne) Paper Golem LLC.
 Alien Thrill Seeker (Book 2) (Aug 2022, with Brian Thorne) LMBPN Publishing. Originally published (Feb 2020, with Brian Thorne) Paper Golem LLC.
 Anger Management (Book 3) (Aug 2022, with Brian Thorne) LMBPN Publishing. Originally published (Dec 2020, with Brian Thorne) Paper Golem LLC.

Demon Codex (series)

 Soul Bottles (Book 1) (April 2022, with Brian Thorne) LMBPN Publishing.
 At the Speed of a Yeti (Book 2) (May 2022, with Brian Thorne) LMBPN Publishing.
 Undead Alternatives (Book 3) (June 2022, with Brian Thorne) LMBPN Publishing.

Collections and other publications

Collections

 Aliens and A.I.s (March 2005) Eggplant Literary Productions

 Sweet Potato Pie and Other Surrealities (2010) Hadley Rille Books.

 Creature Academy: cautionary poems of public education (Oct 2018) Paper Golem LLC

 Sweet Potato Pie: and Other Stories , 2nd Edition (Dec 2018) Paper Golem LLC. 1st Edition was Sweet Potato Pie and Other Surrealities (2010)

 The Rule of Three: and Other Stories (July 2020) Paper Golem LLC

 Openings without Closure (Dec 2020) Paper Golem LLC.

 Eating Authors: One Hundred Writers' Most Memorable Meals (And Other Stories) (Dec 2020) Paper Golem LLC.
 Transcendent Boston and Other Stories (June 2022) Paper Golem LLC

Works in Other Anthologies and Publications

Short Stories:

Poetry:

Short story and poetry publishing history
Full Publishing Histories:

Edited works
 Prime Codex (2007, with Michael Livingston)
 Alembical (2008, with Arthur Dorrance)
 Cucurbital (2008, with Arthur Dorrance)
 Eyes Like Sky and Coal and Moonlight: Stories by Cat Rambo (2009, with Michael Livingston) (ISBN) 
 Alembical 2 (2010, with Arthur Dorrance)
 Rejiggering the Thingamajig and Other Stories by Eric James Stone (2011, with Arthur Dorrance)
 Cucurbital 2 (2011)
 Cucurbital 3 (2012)
 The Wizard of Macatawa and Other Stories by Tom Doyle (2012)
 Alembical 3 (2014, with Arthur Dorrance)
 Cats in Space (2015)

Awards and nominations

 2007 - John W. Campbell Award for Best New Writer (nominee). As of 2020 now known as the "Astounding Award" 
 2010 - Hugo Award for Best Short Story (nominee) - "The Moment" 
 2012 - WSFA Small Press Award (nominee) - "Yesterday's Tastes" 
 2013 - Nebula Award for Best Novella (nominee) - "Barry's Tale" 
 2013 - WSFA Small Press Award (nominee) - "Coca Xocolatl"
 2014 - Nebula Award for Best Novella (nominee) - "Trial of the Century" 
 2015 - Nebula Award for Best Novella (nominee) - "Calendrical Regression" 
 2015 - Cóyotl Award for Best Novel (Winner)  - Barsk: The Elephants' Graveyard   
 2016 - Nebula Award for Best Novel (nominee) - Barsk: The Elephants' Graveyard 
 2016 - Kevin O'Donnell Service to SFWA Award (recipient) 
 2018 - Nebula Award for Best Novella (nominee) - Barry's Deal 
 2019 - Nebula Award for Best Novelette (nominee) - The Rule of Three 
 2020 - Cóyotl Award Finalist - Soup of the Moment

Interviews (text)
Codex Blog Tour w/ Luc Reid "Marginally self-aware collections of atoms", March 01, 2011
Codex Blog Tour w/ Nancy Fulda - March 01, 2011
Michael A. Ventrella - March 14, 2011
Codex Blog Tour w/ Eric James Stone - April 13, 2011
Codex Blog Tour w/ Gray Rinehart - April 21, 2011
Lucy Pireel "All That's Written" - September 6, 2013
Bull Spec's "Coming to Town" Ada Brown - January 9, 2014
Wired.com's Geek Guide to the Galaxy "How the Klingon and Dothraki Languages Conquered Hollywood" October 4, 2014
Allium Online, "Writing, Talking Elephants, and Klingons: Lawrence M. Schoen discusses his writing process" w/ Jack Bradley, published - May 21,2021

Interviews (video)
Emmett Plant "All Thumbs" - May 25, 2012
MTV Geek! "Why Learn Klingon?" - September 2, 2012
MTV Geek! "How Klingon Started" - September 2, 2012
MTV Geek! "Klingon" - September 2, 2012
MTV Geek! "Klingon Language Institute" - September 2, 2012
ConQuesT 45, Christopher J. Garcia "Themed For Your Pleasure" - May 24, 2013

References

External links

Lawrence M. Schoen's official website
Paper Golem's official website
Klingon Language Institute's official website

1959 births
Living people
21st-century American novelists
American fantasy writers
American male novelists
American science fiction writers
Lake Forest College faculty
New College of Florida faculty
Linguists of Klingon
American hypnotists
American male short story writers
21st-century American short story writers
21st-century American male writers
Novelists from Illinois
Novelists from Florida